Robert-Espagne is a commune in the Meuse department in Grand Est in north-eastern France.

On 29 August 1944, the 3rd Panzergenadier Division  of the  German Wehrmacht massacred 86 inhabitants of this and the three neighboring villages of Beurey-sur-Saulx, Couvonges and  Mognéville. This is also referred to as the Massacre de la vallée de la Saulx.

See also
Communes of the Meuse department

References

External links

Robert-Espagne: C'est en France! (in French)

Robertespagne
Nazi war crimes in France
Collective punishment
Massacres in France